IMOINDA or She Who Will Lose Her Name is a 2008 opera and the first libretto to be written by an African-Caribbean woman, Professor Joan Anim-Addo. It is a re-writing of Aphra Behn's Oroonoko, first published in 1688.

Synopsis 
The play features Oroonoko's lover Imoinda, a young African princess who is doubly enslaved, once by her king into marriage and then sold into the trans-Atlantic slave trade. The work focuses on her experience with the slave masters and the birth of a child who symbolizes the triumphant survival of African-heritage people forcibly transplanted in the Caribbean diaspora. Imoinda is ultimately reunited with Oroonoko.

Publication 
The libretto was first published in Italian (translated by Dr Giovanna Covi and Chiara Pedrotti) by the University of Trento and then later re-published in English by Mango Publishing as demand for it grew.

Productions 
It has been performed in New York City, United States. In May 2008, the State University of New York at Geneseo and the Rochester School of the Arts put on a performance with funding from the New York State Music Fund.

In 2019 the work was performed by Goldsmiths at the University of London.

References

2008 compositions
British musicals
Musicals based on books